Chris Pearce is the name of:

 Chris Pearce (politician) (born 1963), Australian politician
 Chris Pearce (footballer) (born 1961), Welsh footballer
 Christopher Pearce (cricketer) (born 1984), English cricketer
 Christopher Pierce (rower) (born 1942), British rower who competed at the 1972 Summer Olympics

See also
Chris Pierce, American musician